Camila Fuentes (born 29 September 1995) is an American-born Mexican former tennis player.

Fuentes has career-high WTA rankings of 617 in singles, reached on 18 May 2015, and of 433 in doubles, achieved on 24 August 2015.

She made her WTA Tour debut at the 2014 Monterrey Open, in the doubles event partnering Alejandra Cisneros, losing in the first round to the second seeds Gabriela Dabrowski and Oksana Kalashnikova, 5–7, 6–1, [7–10].

ITF finals

Doubles: 5 (3–2)

External links
 
 

1995 births
Living people
Mexican female tennis players
Sportspeople from El Paso, Texas